Crossing the BLVD: strangers, neighbors, aliens in a new America is a book by Warren Lehrer and Judith Sloan published in 2003 by W.W. Norton that focuses on the cultural experiences and stories of first-generation immigrants in the Queens borough of New York. 
Winner of the 2004 Brendan Gill Prize.

It documents the lives of 79 immigrants living in Queens, each with a story to tell. The first-person narratives are drawn from audio-taped interviews, while the book's ever-changing graphics and typefaces mirror the rich pastiche of religion, language and tradition that coexists in the borough. Among the subjects: a Nigerian Pentecostal "prophetess," public school teachers recruited from Austria, a lawyer from Columbia who delivers food and six exiled Chinese women who practice the gentle exercises of Falun Gong in a schoolyard. The Gill Prize was established 17 years ago to encourage innovative artistic responses to urban life and, in Brendan's own words, "help us to understand our city and its endless creative yield." “Immigrant life in Queens, as told in the intimate, rich, comic, ironic and sad stories so often seen but not heard in America’s big cities... Archie Bunker doesn’t live here anymore – not in the Queens of Crossing the Blvd. The first-person narratives are engaging... The stories are so different, and yet many of the immigrants’ lives are so similar... What links them all is the desperation and desire that brought them here. As one immigrant says in Crossing the BLVD, 'America can do without you, but you can't do without America'.” - The Washington Post Lynne Duke.

The book was developed into an exhibition and performance which toured throughout the United States from 2004 through 2012 after opening at the Queens Museum of Art, in Flushing Meadows Park, Queens, NY.

References

 
 

 http://cityroom.blogs.nytimes.com/2007/10/31/an-oral-history-of-queens-immigrants-hits-the-road/?pagemode=print
 https://www.nytimes.com/2009/04/13/nyregion/13websloan.html
 exhibition: https://web.archive.org/web/20110717065414/http://tnjn.com/2008/oct/27/ut-hosts-crossing-the-blvd-exh/
 https://web.archive.org/web/20110614164417/http://www.plattsburgh.edu/news/index.php?wl_mode=more&wl_eid=474
 NPR: https://www.npr.org/2004/06/01/1918185/crossing-the-blvd-a-poem-to-a-haitian-brother
 review: reading room https://web.archive.org/web/20080905131347/http://www.communityarts.net/readingroom/archivefiles/2006/04/street_cred_two.php
 review: http://www.forward.com/articles/6885/
 NPR: https://www.npr.org/2004/03/15/1767484/crossing-the-boulevard-cargo-man-from-the-congo

External links
 Homepage
 https://web.archive.org/web/20081121221147/http://www2.wwnorton.com/catalog/spring03/032466.htm
 https://web.archive.org/web/20090720091953/http://www2.facinghistory.org/Campus/reslib.nsf/llbooks/Crossing%2Bthe%2BBLVD%3A%2BStrangers%2C%2BNeighbors%2Band%2BAliens%2Bin%2Ba%2BNew%2BAmerica?OpenDocument
 http://www.wnyc.org/shows/tnbt/episodes/2004/01/23
 https://web.archive.org/web/20080725064316/http://www.nfcb.org/awards/goldenreelwinners2005.jsp
 https://web.archive.org/web/20080509163032/http://www.kupferbergcenter.org/crossing.htm
 https://web.archive.org/web/20071030021522/http://www.citylimits.org/content/articles/viewarticle.cfm?article_id=2980

2003 non-fiction books
W. W. Norton & Company books
History of Queens, New York